Sherman Smalls (1843 - ?) was a carpenter and state legislator in South Carolina. He represented Colleton County, South Carolina in the South Carolina House of Representatives from 1870 to 1874.

He was born in South Carolina. He was a witness for Robert Smalls in his contesting of G. D. Tillman's election to the U.S. Congress.

He admitted to being paid $300 by John J. Patterson to vote to pass the Blue Ridge Scrip bill over the Governors veto.

See also
African-American officeholders during and following the Reconstruction era

References

Year of death missing
People from Colleton County, South Carolina
Members of the South Carolina House of Representatives
African-American state legislators in South Carolina
African-American politicians during the Reconstruction Era
1843 births